Figueira dos Cavaleiros is a freguesia in Ferreira do Alentejo, Portugal. The population in 2011 was 1,346, in an area of 154.20 km2.

References

Freguesias of Ferreira do Alentejo